Western Pacific Agent  is a 1950 Sigmund Neufeld Productions crime drama directed by Sam Newfield and starring Kent Taylor, Sheila Ryan, and Mickey Knox. The picture was written by Fred Myton based on a story by Milton Raison. It was released in West Germany as Jack der Killer.

When released in 2008 on DVD, the New York Times called it a "terse crime film".

Plot
In the present-day American West, detectives for the Western Pacific Railroad investigate several murders, including one of a railroad detective killed during a train robbery.

Cast
Kent Taylor as Rod Kendall 
Sheila Ryan as Martha Stuart 
Mickey Knox as Frank Wickens 
Morris Carnovsky as Joe 'Pop' Wickens
Robert Lowery as Bill Stuart

Other
Western Pacific Agent was the last Hollywood film Morris Carnovsky made before he was blacklisted.

References

External links
 

1950 films
1950 crime drama films
American black-and-white films
1950s English-language films
Lippert Pictures films
American crime drama films
Films directed by Sam Newfield
1950s American films